Richard Aldtyngton was the Archdeacon of Barnstaple during 1400.

References

Archdeacons of Barnstaple